is a railway station in the city of  Namerikawa, Toyama, Japan, operated by the private railway operator Toyama Chihō Railway.

Lines

Station layout 
The station has one ground-level island platform serving two tracks, connected to the wooden station building by a level crossing. The station is staffed.

Platforms

History
It was renamed to its present name on 20 February 1921.

Adjacent stations

Passenger statistics
In fiscal 2015, the station was used by 235 passengers daily.

Surrounding area 
Namerikawa Athletic Park
Nambu Elementary School

See also
 List of railway stations in Japan

References

External links

 

Railway stations in Toyama Prefecture
Railway stations in Japan opened in 1913
Stations of Toyama Chihō Railway
Namerikawa, Toyama